"Shoes" is the debut single by comedian Liam Kyle Sullivan, performed by his female Kelly character. It was released for digital download on August 29, 2006. For a time, it also made Sullivan, and Kelly, a notable figure in pop culture.

Music video

The music video was released along with the song on Liam Kyle Sullivan's official YouTube account. The song became an instant hit on the internet, and has been viewed over 68,000,000 times on Sullivan's YouTube account alone.

The video starts out with Kelly (Sullivan), along with her mother (Pam Cook), father (Sullivan), and twin brother (Sullivan). It is the twins' birthday, and they are about to open their presents. Her brother goes first and gets a new computer and a car. Kelly's present turns out to be a large, purple stuffed dinosaur with a goofy grin. After arguing with her family for a few moments, Kelly turns to leave. When asked where she's going, she replies "I'm going to get what I want." Her father, obviously knowing what that is, says, "Christ". 

Kelly is then seen singing the song while visiting various shoe stores with her friends. At four shoe stores, the clerks tell Kelly she has too many shoes. She pushes one of them down and steps on his face. When a store clerk says her feet are kinda big, Kelly screams at the woman and a fight breaks out, with the purple stuffed dinosaur from the beginning saving Kelly from an angry mall cop. The video shows a party going on outside and scenes of two girls dancing with a ring of fire. 

Sullivan portrayed Kelly in the VH1 special I Hate My 30's. The character of Kelly was featured in the 2007 music video "Shores of California" by The Dresden Dolls and in Weezer's "Pork and Beans" music video, along with many other internet stars. The song won the 2008 People's Choice Award for "Best User Generated Video".

References

External links
 
 

2006 songs
Internet memes
Viral videos